Bootlegger, Vol. 1 is the name of a live recording by Grey DeLisle. Despite its name, it was a limited official release and not an actual bootleg recording. Most material is derived from DeLisle's 2002 release Homewrecker, though several covers are also included.

Track listing
"That's All Right (Mama)" (Arthur Crudup)
"Homewrecker"
"Frozen in Time"
"My Dixie Darling"
"Usted"
"Showgirl"
"Don't Worry Baby" (Brian Wilson)
"'Twas Her Hunger"
"The Hole"
"Ferris Wheels and Freakshows"

Notes
"That's All Right (Mama)" was originally recorded by Elvis Presley and was written by Arthur Crudup.
"My Dixie Darling" was originally recorded by The Carter Family.
"Don't Worry Baby" was originally recorded by the Beach Boys.

Musicians
Marvin Etzioni - Guitar, mandolin
Willie Aron - acoustic guitar
Murry Hammond - bass guitar, background vocals
Perry Ostrin - Drums

Grey DeLisle albums
2003 live albums